Allan Victor Wiles (29 September 1920 – 31 May 2008) was a New Zealand rugby league footballer and cricketer. He represented New Zealand in rugby league.

Cricket career
Wiles played five first-class matches for Auckland during the 1946/47 season.

Rugby league career
Wiles played for the Mount Albert club in the Auckland Rugby League competition and also represented Auckland.

In 1948, he was named for New Zealand and toured Australia. He played in one of the two test matches, becoming Kiwi #312.

In 1951, during the French tour of New Zealand, Wiles was part of the Auckland side that lost to France 10 – 15.

See also
 List of Auckland representative cricketers

References

External links
 

1920 births
2008 deaths
New Zealand cricketers
Auckland cricketers
Cricketers from Auckland
New Zealand rugby league players
New Zealand national rugby league team players
New Zealand sportsmen
Rugby league centres
Mount Albert Lions players
Auckland rugby league team players